Ernest Thornton (18 May 1905 – 5 February 1992) was a British Labour Party politician.  He was elected Member of Parliament (MP) for Farnworth in a 1952 by-election, and served until his retirement at the 1970 general election. His successor John Roper retained the seat for the Labour Party.

References

External links 
 

1905 births
1992 deaths
General Secretaries of the United Textile Factory Workers' Association
Labour Party (UK) MPs for English constituencies
Ministers in the Wilson governments, 1964–1970
Presidents of the Amalgamated Weavers' Association
UK MPs 1951–1955
UK MPs 1955–1959
UK MPs 1959–1964
UK MPs 1964–1966
UK MPs 1966–1970
United Textile Factory Workers' Association-sponsored MPs